Kearfott-Bane House is a historic home located near Baker Heights, Berkeley County, West Virginia.  The "T" shaped house was built in 1901 in the Queen Anne style.  It features fanciful porches, hipped and gable roofs, and generous use of decorative spindles, fans, and other motifs.

It was listed on the National Register of Historic Places in 1985.

References

Houses on the National Register of Historic Places in West Virginia
Queen Anne architecture in West Virginia
Houses completed in 1901
Houses in Berkeley County, West Virginia
National Register of Historic Places in Berkeley County, West Virginia